Hiroji Kiyotake (清武 博二 Kiyotake Hiroji, born December 21, 1960 in Kagoshima Prefecture, Japan) is a game designer for Nintendo and has been a part of the history of Nintendo since 1983.

Education
Kiyotake graduated from Kyoto Seika University with a BA of Visual Design and was part of the rugby club.

Career
Kiyotake started his employment at Nintendo in 1983, working in the Nintendo Research & Development 1 and Product Engineering Departments, and is currently a member of the Planning and Development Department.

Game design

Metroid
Hiroji was a designer for Metroid, which was originally designed for the Famicom Disk System. Hiroji is the character designer of Samus Aran and named the Metroid character after Pelé, but he later found out that Pelé's full name was Edson Arantes do Nascimento, not Samus Arantes. Hiroji and Yoshio Sakamoto and the rest of the team decided at the end of Metroid to reveal that Samus was a female character, making Samus Aran one of the first female protagonists in a video game.

Wario series

Kiyotake is the original designer of Mario's rival Wario and one of the key people in the Wario series. Kiyotake and Takehiko Hosokawa were the directors and graphic designers of Super Mario Land 2: 6 Golden Coins and Wario Land: Super Mario Land 3. For Virtual Boy Wario Land, he acted as a director, and for Wario games released after Wario Land 4, his role is mostly limited to the Wario design and advising, according to the staff credits of the respective games. During the development of Wario: Master of Disguise, Kiyotake supervised the numerous forms of disguised Wario designed by SUZAK.

Games 
 Pinball (Game & Watch) (1983) - Graphic Designer
 Bassmate Computer | Probe 2000 (1984) - Designer
 Duck Hunt (1984) - Graphic Designer
 Wrecking Crew (1984) - Graphic Designer
 Metroid (1986) - Character Designer (as Kiyotake)
 Kid Icarus (1986) - Assistant (as Kehiroji)
 Famicom Wars (1988) - Design (as Kehiroji)
 Tennis (Game Boy) (1989) - Graphic Designer
 Dr. Mario (1990) - Director, Graphic Designer
 Metroid II: Return of Samus (1991) - Director, Graphic Designer
 Super Mario Land 2: 6 Golden Coins (1992) - Director, Graphic Designer
 Wario Land: Super Mario Land 3 (1994) - Director, Graphic Designer
 Super Metroid (1994) - Samus Original Design
 Wario Blast (1994) — Graphic designer
 Wario Blast: Featuring Bomberman! (1994) - Graphic Designer
 Virtual Boy Wario Land (1995) - Director
 Excitebike: Bun Bun Mario Battle Stadium (1997) - Technical Support
 Wario Land II (1998) - Character Designer
 Tetris DX (1998) - Director
 Mario Party (1998) - Original Character
 Super Smash Bros. (1999) - Original Game Staff (Samus Original Design)
 Mario Golf (Nintendo 64) (1999) - Original Characters
 Mario Golf (Game Boy Color) (1999) - Original Characters
 Mario Party 2 (1999) - Original Characters
 Wario Land 3 (2000) - Designer
 Mario Tennis (Nintendo 64) (2000) - Original Characters
 Kaijin Zona (2000) - Nintendo Staff
 Mario Tennis (Game Boy Color) (2000) - Original Characters
 Mario Party 3 (2000) - Original Character
 Mobile Golf (2001) - Original Characters
 Wario Land 4 (2001) - Designer
 Super Smash Bros. Melee (2001) - Original Game Staff (Character Design: Samus)
 Mario Party 4 (2002) - Original Characters
 Metroid Fusion (2002) - Samus Original Design
 Mario Party-e (2003) - Original Characters
 WarioWare, Inc.: Mega Microgame$! (2003) - Wario Original Design
 Wario World (2003) - Advisor
 Mario Golf: Toadstool Tour (2003) - Character Design
 WarioWare, Inc.: Mega Party Game$! (2003) - Wario Design
 Mario Party 5 (2003) - Character Design
 Metroid: Zero Mission (2004) - Samus Design
 Mario Golf: Advance Tour (2004) - Character Design
 WarioWare: Twisted! (2004) - Wario Design
 Mario Power Tennis (2004) - Character Design
 Mario Party 6 (2004) - Character Design
 WarioWare: Touched! (2004) - Wario Design
 Mario Party Advance (2005) - Character Design
 Mario Party 7 (2005) - Original Character Design
 WarioWare: Smooth Moves (2006) - Wario Design
 Wario: Master of Disguise (2007) - Wario Supervisor
 Mario Party 8 (2007) - Original Character Design
 Zekkyō Senshi Sakeburein (2007) - Supervisor
 Mario Party DS (2007) - Original Character Design
 WarioWare D.I.Y. (2009) - Wario Design
 Metroid: Other M (2010) - Concept Art
 Pushmo (2011) - Special Thanks

Interviews 
 Super Mario Land 2 - 1992 Developer Interview (Shmuplations)
 Nintendo Dream: Famicom Disk System
 Metroid Developer Interview - NES Classic Edition

References

1960 births
Living people
Metroid
Nintendo people